Salbia melanobathrum is a moth in the family Crambidae. It was described by Harrison Gray Dyar Jr. in 1914. It is found in Panama.

The wingspan is about 13 mm. Adults are uniform straw yellow.

References

Spilomelinae
Moths described in 1914